Sampoorna Ramayana is a 1961 Indian Hindi-language Hindu mythological film directed by Babubhai Mistry, based on the Hindu epic Ramayana by Valmiki, starring Mahipal and Anita Guha as Rama and Sita respectively. The film was a box office hit, and became a milestone in the history of Hindu mythology. It was the second significant Hindi film based on Rama, after Vijay Bhatt's hugely popular Ram Rajya (1943). Babubhai, known for his special effects throughout his career, made extensive use of effects to enhance dramatics. The film also made lead actor Anita Guha, who played the role of Sita, a household name. Lata Mangeshkar sang two of the most top-class semi-classical songs in this movie, namely "San Sanan, Sanan, Sanana, Ja Re O Pawan" and "Badalon Barso Nayan Ki Or Se", which are still very popular.

Cast
 Mahipal as Rama
 Anita Guha as Seeta
 B. M. Vyas as Ravana
 Sulochana Latkar as Kaikeyi
 Lalita Pawar as  Manthara
 Helen as Surpanakha
 Pal Sharma as Hanuman
 Achala Sachdev as  Kaushalya
  Krishna Kumari
Raj Kumar
 Anand Kumar
Uma Dutt
Badri Prasad
 Paul Sharma
 Sushil Kumar
 Gopi Krishna as dancer

Soundtrack
The film's music was by Vasant Desai and the lyrics were by Bharat Vyas.

Remakes
It was remade in 1981 by Girish Manukant, starring Manhar Desai, Ranjeet Raj, Anjana.

References

Sources

External links
 
 

1960s Hindi-language films
1961 films
Films based on the Ramayana
Films scored by Vasant Desai
Films directed by Babubhai Mistry